Private John Davis (January 1, 1838 – December 30, 1901) was an American soldier who fought in the American Civil War. Davis received the country's highest award for bravery during combat, the Medal of Honor, for his action at Culloden, Georgia in 1865. He was honored with the award on 17 June 1865.

Biography
Davis was born in Carroll, Kentucky on 1 January 1838. He enlisted into Company F, 17th Indiana Mounted Infantry on June 12, 1861 and mustered out on August 8, 1865. He died on 30 December 1901 and his remains are interred at the Greenwood Cemetery in Canon City, Colorado.

Medal of Honor citation

See also

List of American Civil War Medal of Honor recipients: A–F

References

Bibliography
 

1838 births
1901 deaths
People of Indiana in the American Civil War
Union Army officers
United States Army Medal of Honor recipients
American Civil War recipients of the Medal of Honor
Burials at Fort Logan National Cemetery